Maria Luisa De Crescenzo (born 12 January 1992) is an Italian actress.  Her credits include the television series Rosso San Valentino and the films Young Europe, David's Birthday and A Flat for Three.

Her first acting appearance was the starring role of Chiara in the award-winning film The Best Day of My Life when she was a child.

References

External links
 

Living people
Italian film actresses
Italian television actresses
1992 births